The following lists events that happened during 1953 in the Union of Soviet Socialist Republics.

Incumbents
 First Secretary of the Communist Party of the Soviet Union – Nikita Khrushchev (starting 14 September)
 Chairman of the Presidium of the Supreme Soviet of the Soviet Union – Nikolay Shvernik (until 19 March), Kliment Voroshilov (starting 19 March)
 Chairman of the Council of Ministers of the Soviet Union – Joseph Stalin (until 6 March), Georgy Malenkov (starting 6 March)

Events
 Doctors' plot

March
 5 March – Joseph Stalin dies, starting a power struggle among Soviet leadership.

May
 26 May – 4 August – Norilsk uprising

July
 19 July – 1 August – Vorkuta uprising

August
 12 August – Joe 4, the first Soviet test of a thermonuclear weapon occurs.
 23 August – RDS-4 is first tested.

Births
 21 January –  Larisa Shoygu, politician (d. 2021)
 31 January –  Aron Atabek, Kazakh writer and dissident (d. 2021)
 14 February –  Sergey Mironov, politician
 27 November –  Boris Grebenshchikov, rock musician

Deaths
 5 March - Joseph Stalin, leader of the Soviet Union (born 1878) 
 31 March – Ivan Lebedeff, actor (born 1895)
 12 April – Pavel Terentyevich Korobkov, air force officer (born 1909)
 4 May – Nikolai Cholodny, microbiologist (died 1953)
 8 November – Ivan Alekseyevich Bunin, writer (born 1870)

See also
 1953 in fine arts of the Soviet Union
 List of Soviet films of 1953

References

 
1950s in the Soviet Union
Years in the Soviet Union
Soviet Union
Soviet Union
Soviet Union